The Murphy House is a historic Greek Revival style house in Montgomery, Alabama.  The two-story masonry building was built for John H. Murphy, a Virginia cotton and slavery merchant who owned a large warehouse at 122 Commerce Street, Montgomery, where slave traders in the 1850s confined slaves until they could be sold at auctions. The house was added to the National Register of Historic Places on March 24, 1972.

History
John H. Murphy moved his family to Montgomery and had completed this house by 1851. In 1854 the Montgomery Water Works Company was chartered, with Murphy serving as director.  Murphy died in 1859, but his family stayed in the residence throughout the Civil War.  Documented visitors during this period include Jefferson Davis and William Lowndes Yancey.  The house became the headquarters of the Union Provost Marshal during the military occupation of Montgomery in 1865.

Little is known about the house following the Civil War.  In 1902 the Elks social club bought the house to use as their lodge and maintained it until 1967.  In that year they went bankrupt and the house was foreclosed on, later to be sold at public auction.  In 1970 the Montgomery Water Works and Sanitary Sewer Board purchased and restored the house to serve as their offices.  It has remained in the board's possession to the present day.

See also
National Register of Historic Places listings in Montgomery County, Alabama

References

Houses on the National Register of Historic Places in Alabama
Greek Revival houses in Alabama
Houses completed in 1851
National Register of Historic Places in Montgomery, Alabama
Houses in Montgomery, Alabama
1851 establishments in Alabama